This is a list of Croatian television related events from 1971.

Events

Debuts

Television shows

Ending this year

Births
15 October - Nikša Kušelj, actor

Deaths